Dorothea Rhodes Lummis Moore (Rhodes; after first marriage, Lummis; after second marriage, Moore; November 9, 1857March 4, 1942) was an American physician, writer, newspaper editor, and activist. Although a successful student of music in the New England Conservatory of Music, in Boston, she entered the medical school of Boston University in 1881, and graduated with honors in 1884. In 1880, she married Charles Fletcher Lummis, and in 1885, removed to Los Angeles, California, where she began the practice of medicine. She served as dramatic editor of the Los Angeles Times and also musical editor and critic on that journal. She was instrumental in the formation of a humane society which was brought about through her observations of the neglect and cruelty to the children of the poor, and Mexican families, visited in her practice; and the establishment of the California system of juvenile courts. She wrote for Puck, Judge, Life, Women's Cycle, San Francisco Argonaut, and the Californian, as well as contributing many important papers to the various medical journals of the United States. After divorcing Charles Lummis in 1891, she married secondly Dr. Ernest Carroll Moore in 1896. She was a confidante of Charlotte Perkins Gilman, and a life-long friend of Mary Austin.

Early years and education
Mary Dorothea Rhodes was born in Chillicothe, Ohio, November 9, 1860. Her parents were Josiah H. Rhodes, of Pennsylvania Dutch ancestry, and Sarah Crosby Swift, of New England Puritans ancestry. Several brothers and a sister died in infancy. In 1868, the family moved to Portsmouth, Ohio.

Dorothea entered the Portsmouth Female College, and at the age of sixteen years was graduated as B.A. and was the salutatorian of her class. Two years later, she went to Philadelphia, Pennsylvania, and entered Mme. Emma Seller's conservatory of music. She remained two years, learning some music and hearing a great deal of the best in concert and opera, and reading indiscriminately and superficially everything that was found on the shelves of the Public Library, that looked interesting. Later she went to Boston, Massachusetts, and studied music under James O'Neil of the New England Conservatory of Music.

Career

On April 16, 1880, at Boston, she secretly married Charles Fletcher Lummis, who was then a student at Harvard University. In 1881, she entered Boston University School of Medicine, and graduated with honors in 1884, thought he flunked out before then and went to work for her parents in the Scioto River area of Ohio. Initially engaged in farming, he became a journalist on the Scioto Gazette before he accepted a position with the Los Angeles Times in 1884. During the last year of her college life, Moore served as resident physician in the New England Conservatory of Music. In 1885, she joined her husband in Los Angeles, where she began to practice medicine. She was highly successful in her practice, obtaining prompt recognition from her fellow physicians. She served as president and secretary of the Los Angeles County Medical Association, and as corresponding secretary of the Southern California Medical Society. In her practice, after finding much cruelty and neglect among the children, chiefly of the Mexican-Americans, and among animals, she formed a humane society, and brought the cases of neglect and cruelty into the courts.

Moore served as dramatic editor of the Los Angeles Times, and later, the musical editor and critic of that journal. She also did some notable literary work. She contributed to Kate Field's Washington, Puck, Judge, Life, Woman's Cycle, the Home-Maker, the San Francisco Argonaut and The Californian. She was a member of the Pacific Coast Women's Press Association, and contributed many important papers to the various medical journals of standing in the United States.

Personal life
In 1891, she divorced Lummis. 

On February 17, 1896, she married Dr. Ernest Carroll Moore. Ernest had been a resident of Hull House during his student days in Chicago (1896–98), while Dorothea, ten years his senior, was a teacher there. During the period of 1898–1902, she served a Head Resident of South Park Settlement in San Francisco.

In her vacation tours, she visited many of the Native American pueblos in New Mexico, and made a collection of arrowheads, Navajo silver and blankets, Aconia pottery, baskets and other curios of that area. In 1911, she moved from Los Angeles to New Haven, Connecticut. June 26, 1912, Moore and Dr. Mary F. McCrillis, a homeopathic physician of Evanston, Illinois, sailed away for two months abroad. In 1913, she moved from New Haven to Cambridge, Massachusetts.

Death and legacy
Moore was an invalid for several years before her death. She died March 4, 1942, in California, and was buried at Forest Lawn Memorial Park in Glendale, California. Her letters are held in the Dorothea Rhodes Lummis Moore Collection at the Huntington Library in San Marino, California.

Selected works
 At Sunset
 A Neglected Mission

References

Attribution

Bibliography

External links
 
 

1860 births
1942 deaths
People from Chillicothe, Ohio
Physicians from Ohio
Writers from Ohio
19th-century American newspaper editors
19th-century American women writers
New England Conservatory alumni
Boston University School of Medicine alumni
American women non-fiction writers
19th-century American women physicians
19th-century American physicians
Women newspaper editors
Wikipedia articles incorporating text from A Woman of the Century
Pacific Coast Women's Press Association